Koh Kong Football Club (Khmer: ខេត្តកោះកុង), is a football club based in Koh Kong Province, Cambodia. The club competes in the Hun Sen Cup, the major national cup competition of Cambodian football. The team represents the Province and competes annually in the Provincial Stage of the competition.

Current squad

Honours
 Hun Sen Cup
  '''Provincial Stage Winner (1): 2021

References

https://cncc-football.com/hun-sen-cup.html

External links 
Hun Sen Cup

Football clubs in Cambodia